Nija Charles (born October 20, 1997), professionally known as Nija or Amnija is an American singer-songwriter and record producer. Charles began her professional music career in 2017 writing songs for The Carters ("Heard About Us" and "LoveHappy"); Lady Gaga & Ariana Grande ("Rain on Me"); Cardi B featuring SZA ("I Do"); Cardi B featuring Kehlani ("Ring") and Chris Brown featuring Drake ("No Guidance"). She is signed to Capitol Records and Universal Music Publishing Group.

She was nominated for the first ever Grammy Award for Songwriter of the Year at the 65th Annual Grammy Awards for her work on releases by Beyoncé, Summer Walker, City Girls, Lil Durk, Anitta, Meek Mill, Megan Thee Stallion and Kehlani.

Biography 
Charles gained interest in music as a child, observing her uncle and aunt experiment on the production software Fruity Loops. Raised in Union, New Jersey, Charles graduated in 2015 from Union High School.

In 2016, she enrolled in the Clive Davis Institute of Recorded Music at New York University where she practiced her production and songwriting skills. During the second semester of her sophomore year, Charles met her current manager, Christian McCurdy. He introduced her to RCA Records A&R J Grand, and he flew her to Los Angeles to work with producers and other artists and repertoires in the recording industry. Charles continued traveling between Los Angeles and New York City for short bi-weekly trips, allowing her to work on music in Los Angeles while still attending classes in New York City.  Charles left Clive Davis Institute of Recorded Music in 2017 after signing a publishing deal with Universal Music Publishing Group. As a songwriter and producer, Charles' songs have reached platinum status, having written and produced for Beyoncé, Jay-Z, Chris Brown, Cardi B, SZA, Kehlani, Lady Gaga, Ariana Grande, and Jason Derulo. Charles was placed on BET's 2020 "Future 40" list, which is a list of "40 of the most inspiring and innovative vanguards who are redefining what it means to be unapologetically young, gifted & black".   She was named to Rolling Stone's "Future 25" in October, 2020.

Discography

Extended Plays
Don’t Say I Didn’t Warn You (2022)

Songwriting discography

References

External links
 http://www.svgemagazine.com/music-posts/nija-charles-interview
 https://hiphopdx.com/news/id.47312/title.jay-z-beyonces-everything-is-love-credits-feature-quavo-offset-nav#
 http://www.vulture.com/2018/06/beyonce-and-jay-z-everything-is-love-guide.html
 https://genius.com/a/llmind-details-co-producing-heard-about-us-on-jay-z-and-beyonce-s-everything-is-love-album
 https://www.shortlist.com/entertainment/beyonce-jay-z-new-album-everything-is-love/362106
 http://www.svgemagazine.com/music-posts/nija-charles-interview
 https://www.allmusic.com/artist/nija-charles-mn0003685018

Living people
1997 births
People from Union Township, Union County, New Jersey
Union High School (New Jersey) alumni
American women songwriters
Record producers from New Jersey
21st-century American women musicians
American women record producers